Madhura Withanage is a  Sri Lankan politician and a member of the Sri Lankan parliament from Colombo Electoral District as a member of the Sri Lanka Podujana Peramuna. He was the former mayor of Sri Jayawardenepura Kotte.

References

Sri Lanka Podujana Peramuna politicians
Living people
Members of the 16th Parliament of Sri Lanka
Year of birth missing (living people)